is a traditional Italian fruit bread. It is baked in a wood-fired oven and is eaten at about the time of I Santi on 1 November and I Morti on the following day. It is a speciality of Siena and the Maremma, and is among the products of Tuscany with prodotto agroalimentare tradizionale status.

History 

Pane coi santi is a traditional Italian regional product, strongly associated both with the city of Siena and with the feast of I Santi on 1 November and I Morti on the following day. George Gissing wrote in his diary for 1 November 1897: "At Siena (and here only) they eat to-day a kind of very plain plum-cake called Pane coi santi".

Preparation 

The traditional ingredients are flour, olive oil, raisins and walnuts. Other ingredients may include almonds, pine kernels, honey, figs and dates.

The flour is used to make a leavened bread dough, into which the other ingredients are then mixed. It is then formed into a low round or oval loaf and baked in a wood-fired oven. The result is fragrant, of a moderately dark brown, and fairly soft.

References

sweet breads
Italian breads
Cuisine of Tuscany